Valea Popii may refer to several villages in Romania:

 Valea Popii, a village in Mihăești Commune, Argeș County
 Valea Popii, a village in Priboieni Commune, Argeș County
 Valea Popii, a village in Radovanu Commune, Călărași County
 Valea Popii, a village in Valea Călugărească Commune, Prahova County
 Valea Popii, a village in Todirești Commune, Vaslui County